Konstantinovka is a rural locality (a selo) and the administrative center of Konstantinovsky Selsoviet, Kulundinsky District, Altai Krai, Russia. The population was 344 as of 2013. There are 4 streets.

Geography 
Konstantinovka is located 18 km northeast of Kulunda (the district's administrative centre) by road. Myshkino is the nearest rural locality.

References 

Rural localities in Kulundinsky District